San Román de Campezo or Durruma Kanpezu is a hamlet and council located in the municipality of Bernedo, in Álava province, Basque Country, Spain. As of 2020, it has a population of 26.

Geography 
San Román de Campezo is located 38km southeast of Vitoria-Gasteiz.

References

Populated places in Álava